Troxell-Steckel House is a historic home located in Egypt, Pennsylvania in the Lehigh Valley region of eastern Pennsylvania. It was built in 1756 by Johannes Peter Troxell (1719-1799), and is a -story, fieldstone dwelling with a high-pitched gable roof in the Pennsylvania-German style. It measures 48 feet long and 35 feet wide. Also on the property is a contributing stone spring house and late-19th century barn. The house and property were given to the Lehigh County Historical Society in 1942, and is now open as a historic house museum.

It was added to the National Register of Historic Places in 1980.

References

External links
Troxell-Steckel House at Discover Lehigh Valley
Troxell-Steckel House at The Historical Marker Database

1851 establishments in Pennsylvania
Georgian architecture in Pennsylvania
Historic house museums in Pennsylvania
Historic House Museums of the Pennsylvania Germans
Houses completed in 1851
Houses in Lehigh County, Pennsylvania
Houses on the National Register of Historic Places in Pennsylvania
Museums in Lehigh County, Pennsylvania
National Register of Historic Places in Lehigh County, Pennsylvania